The LIBIS KB-11 Branko was a 1950s Slovenian four-seat monoplane designed and produced by LIBIS aircraft during Yugoslavian period.

Design and development
The aircraft design office of the LIBIS aircraft (Letalski Inštitut Branko Ivanuš Slovenija) brought together teachers and students of the Ljubljana technical high school. The KB-11 Branko was a development of the earlier two-seat KB-6 Matajur.
First flown in December 1959 the KB-11 was an all-metal cantilever low-wing monoplane with retractable tricycle landing gear and an enclosed heated and ventilated cockpit for four persons. It was intended for use as an air-taxi or for business use but only small numbers were built.

Specifications (KB-11)

Notes

References

See also

LIBIS aircraft